Isaac Isidore Bruce (born November 10, 1972) is an American former professional football player who was a wide receiver in the National Football League (NFL). He was drafted by the Los Angeles Rams in the second round of the 1994 NFL Draft after playing college football for the University of Memphis. He is currently the athletic director of the University of Fort Lauderdale, a Christian college with HBCU roots.

An All-Pro and four-time Pro Bowl selection, Bruce amassed 15,208 receiving yards in his career (fifth all-time). He played the first 14 years with the Rams and won a Super Bowl ring with the team in Super Bowl XXXIV over the Tennessee Titans. He also played for the San Francisco 49ers. During his time with the Rams, he was the leading wide receiver of "The Greatest Show on Turf". In 2020, Bruce was elected into the Pro Football Hall of Fame.

Early years
Bruce was born in Fort Lauderdale, Florida. He graduated from Dillard High School in Fort Lauderdale in 1990. As a senior for the Panthers football team, he caught 39 passes for 644 yards (16.5 yards per rec. avg.), was an All-County selection, and led his team to the 1989 Florida State 4-A Championship.

College career
Bruce originally signed his letter of intent to play college football for the Purdue Boilermakers in 1990, but his SAT scores were too low for Purdue to accept him. Bruce then decided to attend West Los Angeles College, then to Santa Monica College before transferring to the Memphis State University, where he played beside fellow future NFL receiver Russell Copeland. In 1992, Bruce's first year with Memphis, he had 39 receptions for 532 yards and five touchdowns. In 1993, he became the first wide receiver in program history to post a 1,000-yard receiving season. He finished the season with a school-record 74 catches for 1,054 yards and 10 touchdowns. He earned a degree from Memphis in physical education, and he is the only Memphis player to be selected to the Pro Football Hall of Fame.

College statistics

Professional career

Los Angeles Rams
Bruce was drafted in the 2nd round (33rd overall) by the Los Angeles Rams. He signed a 3-year, $1.75 million contract with the Rams on July 14, 1994. He earned the 1994 Carroll Rosenbloom Award, given to the team rookie of the year. He was also voted Rams Rookie of the Year by Orange County Sports Association and the Southern California Sports Broadcasters Association. His first NFL reception was a 34-yard touchdown throw from Chris Miller at Atlanta on September 11, 1994.

St. Louis Rams
He moved with the team to St. Louis in 1995. In 1995, Bruce was named the NFC's week 1 Special Teams player of the Week after blocking a punt that contributed to a Rams win. He was also the NFC Offensive Player of the Week for week 6 following a 10-catch, 191 yard, 2 TD performance. His total receiving yards for 1995 (119 catches for 1,781 yards) was second only to Jerry Rice’s then record of 1,848 yards for one season, and is still the fifth most in a single season. In accomplishing this feat, Isaac Bruce surpassed former Houston Oilers WR Charley Hennigan’s 34-year-old record of 1,746 set in 1961. Bruce’s 119 catches also ranks 12th on the NFL’s all-time single-season reception list. Bruce further broke four Rams’ records, including most receiving yards, most receptions, most consecutive 100-yard receiving games (6) and most 100-yard games (9). Bruce made USA Today’s All-Joe team, All-Madden, and All-Pro by Sports Illustrated and he was voted a first alternate to the Pro Bowl. He was also awarded the Rams MVP.

In 1996, Bruce led his team with 84 receptions and led the NFL with 1,338 yards. He became the first Rams receiver since Henry Ellard in 1990 and 1991 to post back-to-back 1,000-yard seasons. Against the Baltimore Ravens on October 27, 1996, he caught 11 passes for 229 yards and a touchdown. On November 30, 1996, Bruce was re-signed by the Rams to a 4-year $12.1 million contract extension. In 1996 Bruce was also voted to his first Pro Bowl, after having been an alternate the season before.

In the following seasons, Bruce was hampered by hamstring injuries. In 1997, he missed the first six games due to injury and in 1998 he missed the final nine games (he also missed two other games earlier in the season). In Atlanta on November 2, 1997, Bruce had another 200-yard game, totaling 10 catches, 233 yards and recording 2 touchdowns. Prior to his injury in 1998 in a home game against the Minnesota Vikings, Bruce had 11 catches for 192 yards and an 80-yard touchdown.

In 1999, Bruce was a Second-team All-Pro and was voted to his second Pro Bowl. He caught 77 passes for 1,165 yards and 12 touchdowns as Rams had a 13–3 record and advanced to the Super Bowl. He also led Rams in receiving yards in the playoffs, with 317 yards on 13 catches with a team-high two touchdowns. Bruce caught Kurt Warner’s 73-yard touchdown pass late in the fourth quarter of Super Bowl XXXIV to give the Rams a 23–16 lead, which turned out to be the game winner.

Prior to the 2000 season, Bruce was re-signed by the Rams to a 7-year, $42 million contract extension. In 2000, Bruce was again a Pro Bowler and caught 87 passes for 1,471 yards and 9 touchdowns. He became the first Rams receiver to earn back-to-back Pro Bowl invitations since Henry Ellard accomplished the feat for the 1988 and 1989 seasons. Bruce either led or was tied for the most receptions six times in 2000, led the team in receiving yards six times, and posted four 100-yard receiving games. That same year, Bruce and teammate Torry Holt became only the second WR duo from the same team to each gain over 1,400 yards in the same season (see Herman Moore and Brett Perriman).

In 2001, the Rams returned to the Super Bowl, losing to the New England Patriots, and Bruce made the Pro Bowl for the fourth time, becoming only the third receiver in franchise history to earn three consecutive Pro Bowl invitations (Elroy Hirsch 1951–53, Jim Phillips 1960–62). Bruce was voted offensive captain and became the franchise career leader in 100-yard receiving games (29), 1,000-yard seasons (5), and receiving touchdowns (56). He became just the second player in team history to post 500 career receptions vs. New York Giants on October 14, 2001. He caught five passes for 56 yards against New England in Super Bowl XXXVI.

Bruce became the Rams’ all-time leader in receptions in 2002 while posting his fourth consecutive 1,000-yard receiving season. That year, he led the team with seven touchdown receptions, and ended the season with 79 receptions for 1,075 yards. On his 30th birthday, Bruce had three fumbles in a game. Luckily for Bruce, he scored a game-winning touchdown and the game is almost forgotten because of 34–34 tie between the Falcons and Steelers the same day.

In 2003, Bruce missed the 1,000-yard mark for the first time since 1998, finishing with 69 catches for 981 yards and 5 touchdowns, however, he became the Rams’ all-time leader in receiving yards (10,461), passing his position coach Henry Ellard (9,761). That year Bruce made seven receptions for 116 yards in the NFC Divisional Playoff Game vs. Carolina on January 10, 2004, making him the only Rams player to have four career 100-yard postseason performances, breaking a tie with Tom Fears.

In 2004, Bruce caught 89 passes (fifth in the NFC, eighth in the NFL) for 1,292 yards (fifth in the NFL). He started the season with four consecutive 100-yard receiving performances, the first player to accomplish this feat since Houston's Charley Hennigan in 1963. Bruce nabbed a team-high nine catches for 170 yards and one touchdown at Green Bay on November 29, 2004.

With the retirement of Jerry Rice, Bruce entered 2005 as the NFL's active leader in career receiving yards; a foot injury caused him to miss 5 games, and he was passed by Marvin Harrison by the end of the season. Still, he became the 14th player in NFL history with 800 career receptions on December 11 at Minnesota.

On March 7, 2006, the Rams released Bruce rather than pay him a $1.5 million bonus; however, five days after releasing him, the Rams agreed to a three-year, $15 million deal with Bruce. The re-signing freed a reported $7.5 million in cap money for the Rams. That season Bruce started 15 of 16 games and notched his eighth career 1,000-yard receiving season with 1,098 yards on 74 catches with three touchdowns.

In 2007, Bruce caught 55 passes for 733 yards and 4 touchdowns, second on his team only to Torry Holt in all three categories. In Week 15, he retook the lead in career receiving yards among active players from Marvin Harrison, and in the same game passed James Lofton to become third on the all-time list.

On February 28, 2008, Bruce was released by the Rams after refusing to take a pay cut, which the Rams promised they would not do in a previous contract renegotiation.

San Francisco 49ers

On February 29, 2008, Bruce signed a two-year, $6 million contract with the San Francisco 49ers, to reunite with his former offensive coordinator Mike Martz. Jerry Rice gave Bruce permission to wear the number 80 although the team had already retired it, however Bruce decided against it and instead wore 88.

On December 21, 2008, in a game at St. Louis against his former team, the Rams, Bruce caught his 1,000th career reception – a 3-yard touchdown catch. St. Louis fans cheered on their former wide receiver, yelling “Bruuuuuuuuce” whenever he caught a pass, and cheered when he caught his 1,000th pass.

After contemplating retirement in the offseason, he elected to return to the 49ers in 2009 for his 16th season, reasoning that he was there to "get in the playoffs again and win a Super Bowl".

On June 7, 2010, Bruce was traded from the 49ers to the Rams so that he would be able to retire as a Ram. Bruce was the last member of the former first-tenure Los Angeles Rams to retire.

NFL career statistics

Regular season

Awards and achievements
2020 - Elected to the Pro Football Hall of Fame.
2009 – Second wide receiver in NFL history to achieve more than 15,000 receiving yards.
2008 – Reaches 1,000 receptions with a touchdown against his former team the St. Louis Rams. Surpassed Tim Brown to become 2nd all-time in receiving yards with 14,944 receiving yards.
2007 – Achieved 14,109 receiving yards and 942 receptions, putting him at 6th place for all-time receptions and 3rd for total yardage. He is also 13th all-time in receiving touchdowns with 84.
2006 – National Sportsmanship Award
2003 – Sports Personality of the Year Award from the Missouri Athletic Club at the annual Jack Buck Sports Award Banquet
2001 – Named to play in Pro Bowl (did not play – injured)
2000 – Named to play in Pro Bowl (did not play – injured)
1999 – Super Bowl XXXIV champion
1999 – Named to play in Pro Bowl
1998 – Rams Sprint Good Sport/Man of the Year
1997 – Rams True Value Man of the Year
1996 – Named to play in Pro Bowl, led league in receiving yards
1995 – Recorded 119 receptions (Most in NFL history by a player 25 and under, voted a Pro Bowl alternate)
1994 – Rams consensus Rookie of the Year

Personal life
Bruce is a Christian. Bruce is nicknamed “The Reverend” because he wishes to become one after he finishes his football career; he also wants to become a substitute teacher.

Bruce is married to Clegzette Bruce. They have two daughters.

Bruce is the elder cousin of Canadian Football League wide receiver Arland Bruce. Bruce is the younger cousin of NFL running back Derrick Moore.

Bruce is a member of the Omega Psi Phi fraternity.

Philanthropy
Since 1996, Isaac Bruce has provided tickets to home games to various schools and youth organizations, including partnering with Haz-Waste to provide jerseys and limousine rides for children. He was a United Way spokesman in 1996–97 and United Way African American Leadership Giver from 1997 to 1999. In 2008, he recorded a public service announcement and personal voice message for the RESPECT! Campaign against domestic violence.

References

External links

 The Isaac Bruce Foundation
 

1972 births
Living people
American football wide receivers
Memphis Tigers football players
Los Angeles Rams players
San Francisco 49ers players
Santa Monica Corsairs football players
St. Louis Rams players
National Conference Pro Bowl players
Players of American football from Fort Lauderdale, Florida
African-American Christians
American Pentecostals
Pro Football Hall of Fame inductees
10,000 receiving yards club
National Football League players with retired numbers
Ed Block Courage Award recipients